Matthew Lovick Walbeck (born October 2, 1969) is a former right-handed Major League Baseball catcher who played from  to  for the Chicago Cubs, Minnesota Twins, Detroit Tigers, Anaheim Angels and Philadelphia Phillies. He attended Sacramento High School.

Walbeck is the former third base and catching coach for the Texas Rangers.

Professional career

The draft and the minor leagues
Standing at 5'11" tall and weighing 190 pounds, Walbeck was taken by the Cubs 192nd overall (eighth round) by the Cubs in the 1987 draft. Although his professional career-started off very well-he hit .314 in 51 games in 1987-he would eventually level out and become an average hitter. He was not much of a power hitter, nor did he consistently hit for a high average. His best minor league season was perhaps 1992, when he hit .301 with seven home runs and 42 RBI. He did try stealing bases seven times that year, but was caught every single time.

The Major Leagues
Walbeck made his Major League debut on April 7, 1993 at the age of 23 against the Atlanta Braves. His rookie season would not be very successful; he hit only .200 in 30 at-bats that season. Walbeck hit the first home run of his career that season, off José DeLeón on April 18.

To the Twins
On November 24, 1993, the Cubs traded Walbeck (with Dave Stevens) to the Twins for pitcher Willie Banks.

In 338 at-bats with the Twins in 1994, he hit .204. On April 27 of that year, he caught Scott Erickson's no-hitter. His batting average was better in 1995; he hit .257 in 393 at-bats.

Onto the Tigers, Part 1
On December 11, 1996, the Twins traded Walbeck to the Tigers for minor leaguer Brent Stentz. In 47 games, he hit .277 with three home runs. He also spent 17 games in the minors, where he hit .305 in 59 at-bats.

Off to the Angels
On November 20, 1997, the Tigers traded Walbeck with Phil Nevin to the Angels for minor leaguer Nick Skuse.

Walbeck hit only .240 in 1999.

After the season, Walbeck was granted free-agency.

Back to the minors
Walbeck-who was signed by the Cincinnati Reds and then purchased by the Phillies in June 2001, playing a total of 107 games in the minors that season. He appeared in only one game for the Phillies in 2001, as a pinch hitter for pitcher Vicente Padilla.

After 2001, he was again granted free agency and signed by the San Diego Padres. Before he could appear in a single regular season game with the Padres, though, he was traded back to the Tigers, on March 22, 2002. He was sent with Damian Jackson for Javier Cardona and minor leaguer Rich Gomez.

He spent 21 games in the minors that year, hitting only .213. After the season, he was granted free agency from the Tigers, only to be re-signed by them before the 2003 season.

2003 was Walbeck's final season. In 138 games for the Tigers, he hit a career-low .174 (although he did hit .417 in four games in the minors that year). He played his final game against one of his former teams-the Twins-on September 28, 2003. He replaced A. J. Hinch as a defensive substitution in that game. On September 23 of that year, he had appeared in his final at-bat-he struck out. His final hit, a two-run home run, came on August 8 off pitcher Kenny Rogers.

Overall, he hit .233 with 28 home runs and 208 RBI in his 11-year career. He stole 13 bases and was caught 12 times. In 2109 at-bats (682 games), he walked 133 times and struck out 343 times. Of all catchers with at least 2000 plate appearances from 1990 to 2009, he had the worst career OPS (on-base plus slugging percentage).

Managerial career
After his retirement in 2003, the Detroit Tigers offered him the manager position of their low Class A affiliate, the West Michigan Whitecaps. In his first year, he guided the Whitecaps to the 2004 Midwest League title. The Whitecaps would again win the Midwest League championship in 2006. After the 2006 season, Walbeck left West Michigan to fill the vacant manager position with the Tigers' Class AA affiliate, the Erie SeaWolves, where he was named EL Manager of the Year.  Baseball America named Walbeck the 2007 Minor League Manager of the Year, spanning all minor league levels.  Additional accolades include 2006 Midwest League Manager of the Year, and Baseball America "Best Tools" Manager in 2005 and 2006.

On November 7, 2007, Walbeck was hired by the Texas Rangers to be their third base coach .  In addition to those duties, Walbeck also handled the catchers and coordinated spring training activities. Walbeck was fired at the end of the 2008 season.

On December 19, 2008, Walbeck landed back in the minors, managing the Eastern League Altoona Curve. In 2010, Walbeck's Curve won the EL championship, and he was again named EL Manager of the Year, but the Pirates fired him after the playoffs.

Walbeck was hired to manage the Rome Braves, the class-A affiliate of the Atlanta Braves for the 2011 season, but was fired on July 7, 2011 after compiling one of the worst records in the minor leagues.

References

External links

1969 births
Living people
Major League Baseball catchers
Baseball players from Sacramento, California
Chicago Cubs players
Minnesota Twins players
Detroit Tigers players
Anaheim Angels players
Philadelphia Phillies players
Altoona Curve managers
Baseball coaches from California
Charleston Wheelers players
Charlotte Knights players
Fort Myers Miracle players
Hardware City Rock Cats players
Iowa Cubs players
Lakeland Tigers players
Louisville RiverBats players
Peoria Chiefs players
Scranton/Wilkes-Barre Red Barons players
Toledo Mud Hens players
Winston-Salem Spirits players
Wytheville Cubs players